An endband is a part of a book, most often found with hardcover bindings, that consists of a small cord or strip of material affixed near the spine to provide structural reinforcement and sometimes decorative effect.  An endband along the top edge of the book (as a book is standing upright) is called a headband, and one along the bottom edge is called a tailband.

An endband, more so the headband, helps to resist the strain placed on the book when shelved upright with the spine facing outward, especially as it is common to pull a book out by hooking a finger over the top edge of the spine.  Endbands were traditionally made from small pieces of vellum, catgut, or cord wrapped or braided with silk; though today they are separately manufactured ribbons.  The endband is tightly sewn to the sections of the book where it can support the weight of the pages.  When endbands are used for decorative purposes they may only be glued in place rather than sewn, though at a loss of reinforcing strength.

See also
Ethiopian binding

References

Bookbinding